Slettnes Lighthouse is the northernmost mainland lighthouse on Earth. It is located in Gamvik Municipality in Troms og Finnmark county, Norway. The  lighthouse is the only cast iron lighthouse in Finnmark county.

This is the easternmost of the three Nordkapp area lighthouses, and it is often considered the North Cape Light, marking the "top" of Europe. Fruholmen Lighthouse is located about  farther north, on the island of Ingøya, but the Slettnes Lighthouse is the northernmost lighthouse on the mainland of Scandinavia.

History
This lighthouse was built from 1903 to 1905. The light on top emits one long (2.5 sec) white flash every 20 seconds. The light burns from 12 August until 24 April each year. It doesn't burn during the summer due to the midnight sun. In 1922 the lighthouse got a foghorn with a siren, which gave a signal every thirty seconds, helping in fog and bad visibility. The fog horn was in use until 1985.

The lighthouse was heavily damaged during World War II by German troops, but it was painstakingly restored after the war.  The restored station was designed by architects Blakstad and Munthe-Kaas and it was completed in 1948. The station is owned by the Kystverket and managed by Gamvik Municipality as a tourist center, and overnight accommodations are available in the station buildings. In 1998, the lighthouse was listed as a heritage site. The lighthouse was automated in 2005.

Gallery

See also

 List of lighthouses in Norway
 Lighthouses in Norway

References

External links

View a map on Google street view
slettneslighthouse.com
Norsk Fyrhistorisk Forening 

Gamvik
Lighthouses completed in 1905
Lighthouses in Troms og Finnmark
1905 establishments in Norway